The Andrea Doria class were helicopter cruisers of the Italian Navy. Italy's first major new designs of the post–World War II era, these ships were primarily designed for anti-submarine warfare tasks. Initially planned for three ships, the two ships that were constructed,  and  served until 1991 in both active and training capacities. The Andrea Doria class formed the basis for the larger  that followed them.

Design
Ordered in the 1957-58 Naval Programme, the Andrea Doria class were designed to operate the RIM-2 Terrier surface-to-air missile (SAM) system and Sikorsky SH-3 Sea King helicopters as both a platform for anti-air and anti-submarine warfare.

The flight deck measured  and was placed aft of the superstructure. It was cantilevered out at the stern to provide extra operational space.

Power and propulsion
The class was powered by four Foster Wheeler boilers. These provided the power to two double reduction geared steam-powered turbines creating  which drove two shafts.

Armament
For anti-air warfare the Andrea Dorias were equipped with one Mk 10 twin-arm launcher with 40 RIM-2 Terrier missiles placed forward. The ships were also provided with eight Oto Melara 76 mm/62 MMI guns to be used for point-blank anti-aircraft defence. The choice to arm the cruisers with the 76 mm guns was based on a decision taken in 1958 that only guns of that size were adequate in point blank air defence. The guns were placed in six single turrets amidships abreast the funnel and the bridge.

The cruisers were also equipped with six  Mk32 torpedo tubes in two triple mounts. These were for use against submarines. In conjunction with the torpedo systems, the Andrea Dorias could embark up to four helicopters. The Sea Kings were found to be too large for the class and the Italians instead chose to use Agusta-Bell AB 212 helicopters modified for anti-submarine warfare.

Electronics
Initially, the Andrea Doria class was equipped with SPS-12 and SPS-39A radars for air search and surveillance and SPQ-2 for navigation. They also carried SQS-39 sonar. The guns were automatically controlled by the Italian-designed NA-9 Orion fire control system guided by the SPG-70 radar.

Ships

History
The class consisted of two vessels both commissioned in 1964 and in service into the late 1980s. A third, Enrico Dandolo (C555), was cancelled. Andrea Doria was modernised in 1976-78, exchanging the RIM-2 missiles for the SM-1ER surface-to-air missile. The ship received an updated electronics package, mounting SPS-40 2-D air search radar, SPG-55C fire control radar and SQS-23 sonar.

Caio Duilio received only a marginal modernisation in 1979-80 and instead was modified to become a training ship. Its aft hangar was removed and replaced with classrooms and two of its 76mm mounts were removed aft. In 1980 it replaced San Giorgio as the fleet's training vessel. Both ships mounted new electronic warfare packages, SPS-768 long-range search radars and SPR-4 intercept and SLQ-D jammers.

Similar ships

Notes

Sources
 Gardiner, Robert; Chumbley, Stephen & Budzbon, Przemysław (1995). Conway's All the World's Fighting Ships 1947-1995. Annapolis, Maryland: Naval Institute Press. .

External links
 Marina Militare official website
 Andrea Doria Marina Militare website

Cruiser classes
 
Cruisers of the Italian Navy